The Thals are a fictional race of humanoid aliens, originating from the planet Skaro, in the British science fiction television series Doctor Who. The species first appeared in the 1963–64 serial The Daleks, and were created by writer Terry Nation.

Fictional history
In The Daleks (1963–64), the Thals describe themselves as a warrior race who fought a terrible neutronic war against the peaceful Dals, with whom they shared the planet Skaro. Radiation from the war caused both species to mutate. In the case of the Thals the mutation came full-circle, returning them to their original appearance of blond humanoids. They have renounced violence and become pacifist farmers. During the story it is revealed that the Dals, now calling themselves 'Daleks', have evolved into aggressive creatures who cannot survive outside of the mobile, metal casings they have created. After centuries of freedom from strife the Thals are forced to take up arms again when the Daleks attempt to wipe them out by releasing radiation into Skaro's atmosphere. The First Doctor helps the Thals to victory, with all of the Daleks apparently dying when the flow of static electricity required to power their casings is disrupted.

In Planet of the Daleks (1973), set many generations after the events of The Daleks, a Thal space expedition is sent to the planet Spiridon. Together the Thals and the Third Doctor defeat a Dalek plan to duplicate the natural invisibility of the planet's inhabitants, launch a ten-thousand strong Dalek army hidden on the planet and release a plague capable of exterminating all organic life.

Thal history was revised in Genesis of the Daleks (1975), in which they were depicted as having been involved in a generations-long war of attrition with the Kaleds. This transformed Skaro into a toxic wasteland, with the survivors of each race forced to live under their own huge, protective dome. The Kaled chief scientist, Davros, genetically engineers mutated members of the Kaled species and places the results into travel machines, which he names Daleks (an anagram of Kaleds). Davros simultaneously provides the Thals with the technology they need to destroy the Kaled dome, so as to wipe out all opposition to his plan to create a species consisting of what he considers to be the ultimate Kaled form. He then sends the Daleks to the Thal dome, where they kill nearly all the inhabitants. A small group of Thals use explosives to seal the Daleks and Davros in a Kaled bunker but the Fourth Doctor speculates that they have only delayed the Dalek development and rise to power by a matter of centuries.

Other appearances
The Thals are mentioned, but not shown, in the TV Century 21 Dalek comic strip story Genesis of Evil (1965). In the narrative the Thals are stated to be a peaceful race, originally inhabiting the continent of Davius, who are at war with the Daleks; short, aggressive, blue-skinned humanoids who inhabit the continent of Dalazar. The Daleks plan to use a neutron bomb against the Thals but a meteorite storm detonates it prematurely, causing planet-wide destruction in which the Thals apparently perish.

Thals are featured in the film Dr. Who and the Daleks (1965), which is based upon the BBC Doctor Who television programme serial The Daleks, and the film's 1966 comic book adaptation.

The Thals appear in the Eighth Doctor Adventures novel War of the Daleks (1997) by John Peel, which depicts them as having once again become a warlike society, willing to destroy an inhabited planet simply as part of a trap to defeat a Dalek attack fleet.

In the Big Finish Productions audio play The Mutant Phase (2000), a Thal attempt to use a biological weapon against the Daleks nearly creates a monstrous insectoid race.

A Thal expedition captured by the Daleks features in the Telos novella The Dalek Factor (2004) by Simon Clark.

In the Big Finish audio play Brotherhood of the Daleks (2008), the Sixth Doctor discovers a Thal project to brainwash Daleks to act as 'sleeper agents', only for the plan to fail when the Daleks' true nature asserts itself.

References

External links

Doctor Who races
Daleks
Television characters introduced in 1963